The Donington Grand Prix was a Grand Prix motor race held at the Donington Park circuit in Leicestershire, England, from 1935 to 1938.

The Donington Grand Prix was held just four times, but quickly rose to prominence as one of the most important races in Europe. A fifth race was planned for 1939 but was cancelled due to the start of World War II.

Winners

History
The first edition of the Donington Grand Prix took place on 5 October 1935. Circuit renovations were undertaken in preparation for the event, these included improving the spectator lot, installing loud speakers, and erecting new bridges at Coppice-lane, Redgate Corner and the Starkey Hairpin.

The 1939 edition of the race was originally scheduled for 30 September, with Mercedes-Benz and Auto Union cars scheduled to enter, but was cancelled on 8 September due to World War II. The circuit was closed in 1939 due to the war, when it was requisitioned by the Ministry of Defence and was converted into a military vehicle depot.

Post-war 

The circuit reopened in 1977. The Donington Grand Prix Collection was created at the circuit which included cars from the Pre-war races, including a 1939 Auto Union car, which did not compete at the circuit, but did mark the first time that an Auto Union car had returned to the circuit following the 1938 Grand Prix. Historic races were organised for 1979 and 1980, these included Pre-war events to commemorate the early Donington Grand Prix races.

The circuit returned to hosting Grand Prix racing with the one-off 1993 European Grand Prix.

Legacy
Although not considered an official British Grand Prix, the Donington Grand Prix is widely regarded as being on a similar level of importance. It was the only major international Grand Prix held in the United Kingdom during the 1930s, and paved the way for the United Kingdom's rise to international prominence in Grand Prix Racing after the second World War.

References

 
Pre-World Championship Grands Prix